Japanese football in 1952.

Emperor's Cup

Births
January 15 - Tatsuhiko Seta
March 12 - Yasuhiko Okudera
April 16 - Yoshikazu Nagai
May 10 - Masaki Yokotani
October 27 - Atsuyoshi Furuta
December 15 - Yukitaka Omi

External links

 
Seasons in Japanese football